Final Destination is an American horror franchise composed of films, comic books and novels.

Films in the franchise:
Final Destination (film), a 2000 film
Final Destination 2, a 2003 film
Final Destination 3, a 2006 film
The Final Destination, also known as Final Destination 4, a 2009 film
Final Destination 5, a 2011 film

Final Destination may also refer to:

In music:
Final Destination (album) by Coldrain
Final Destination, by Juelz Santana
"Final Destination", by Rasco from The Birth EP

In other uses:
 "Final Destination", a recurring stage in the Super Smash Bros. series
 "Final Destination" (Rick and Morty), an episode of the sixth season of Rick and Morty